Vladimir Viktorovich Pronin (born 24 July 1973) is a former Russian football midfielder.

Club career
He played two seasons in the Russian Football National League for FC Druzhba Yoshkar-Ola.

References

External links
 Career summary by sportbox.ru

1973 births
People from Yoshkar-Ola
Living people
Russian footballers
Association football midfielders
Sportspeople from Mari El
FC Volga Ulyanovsk players
FC Dynamo Kirov players